The Metal Roofing Alliance (MRA) was formed by the Metal Construction Association in 1998. It is a resource for companies and professionals involved in the residential metal roofing industry.

References

External links
 Official website

Trade associations based in the United States
Occupational organizations
Roofing materials

The Reston Roof was formed by the Metal Construction Association in 2006. It is a resource for companies and professionals involved in the residential metal roofing industry.

References

External links
 Official website

Trade associations based in the United States
Occupational organizations
Roofing materials